Jimmie Kenneth Johnson (born September 17, 1975) is an American professional auto racing driver who competes in the NTT IndyCar Series, driving the No. 48 Honda full-time for Chip Ganassi Racing and IMSA WeatherTech SportsCar Championship, driving the No. 48 Cadillac on a part-time schedule for Ally Cadillac Racing. A seven-time NASCAR Cup Series champion, he competed full-time in the series from 2002 to 2020, driving the No. 48 Chevrolet with Hendrick Motorsports, before transitioning to open-wheel racing. Johnson's seven Cup championships, the first five of which are consecutive, are tied with Richard Petty and Dale Earnhardt for the most all-time; his successes have caused many analysts and fellow drivers to consider Johnson as one of the greatest NASCAR drivers of all time.

Career summary

* Season still in progress.

NASCAR
(key) (Bold – Pole position awarded by qualifying time. Italics  – Pole position earned by points standings or practice time. * – Most laps led.)

Cup Series

Daytona 500

Nationwide Series

Craftsman Truck Series

 Ineligible for series championship points.

Rolex Sports Car Series

Daytona Prototype
(key) Bold – Pole Position. (Overall Finish/Class Finish).

Complete IMSA SportsCar Championship results
(key)(Races in bold indicate pole position)

* Season still in progress.

American open-wheel racing results
(key)

IndyCar Series
(key)

* Season still in progress.

Indianapolis 500

International Race of Champions
(key) (Bold – Pole position. * – Most laps led.)

References

Career achievements of racing drivers
Jimmie Johnson